Sara Montpetit is a Canadian actress and environmental activist from Quebec. She is most noted for her performance in the 2021 film Maria Chapdelaine, for which she won the Prix Iris for Revelation of the Year at the 24th Quebec Cinema Awards.

In 2021 she was cast in Charlotte Le Bon's film Falcon Lake, which premiered at the 2022 Cannes Film Festival. In 2022 she was cast in Ariane Louis-Seize's Vampire humaniste cherche suicidaire consentant, planned for release in 2023.

She received a Canadian Screen Award nomination for Best Supporting Performance in a Film at the 11th Canadian Screen Awards in 2023, for her performance in Falcon Lake.

References

External links

21st-century Canadian actresses
Canadian film actresses
Canadian environmentalists
Canadian women activists
Actresses from Quebec
French Quebecers
Living people
Year of birth missing (living people)